Nossa nagaensis is a moth in the family Epicopeiidae first described by Henry John Elwes in 1890. It is found in the Indian state of Assam.

References

Moths described in 1890
Epicopeiidae